Mermaid Avenue Vol. II is a 2000 album of previously unheard lyrics written by American folk singer Woody Guthrie, put to music written and performed by British singer Billy Bragg and American band Wilco. It continues the project originally conceived by Guthrie's daughter, Nora Guthrie which resulted in the release of Mermaid Avenue in 1998. Both volumes were collected in a 2012 box set along with volume three as Mermaid Avenue: The Complete Sessions.

Track 9 "Blood of the Lamb" is Woody's overhaul of an 1878 gospel music standard "Are You Washed in the Blood?" written by Elisha A. Hoffman.

Man in the Sand, a documentary about the collaboration between Bragg and Wilco, was released in 1999.

Track listing

Personnel
Billy Bragg – vocal, guitar, resonator guitar
Jay Bennett – guitar, backing vocal, slide guitar, shaker, saw, 12 string guitar, B3 organ, Leslie pedals, Farfisa organ, mandolin, piano, tambourine, electric sitar, soloing, nylon string guitar, banjo, harmonica, drums, upright bass, Delayaphone, bells
Ken Coomer – drums, tape box, tambourine, percussion, backing vocal, hollering, kick drum, gas heater
John Stirratt – bass, backing vocal, claps, upright bass, baritone guitar
Jeff Tweedy – vocal, guitar, clapping, Mellotron, cabasa, 12 string guitar, slide guitar, mandolin, Wurlitzer

Additional musicians
Mike Henry – backing vocal on "My Flying Saucer"
Natalie Merchant – guest lead vocal on "I Was Born"
Leroy Bach – piano on "Remember The Mountain Bed"
Corey Harris – guest lead vocal and acoustic guitar on "Against Th' Law"
Eliza Carthy – violin on "Joe DiMaggio Has Done It Again"

Charts

See also
Woody Guthrie Foundation
Mermaid Avenue (1998)
Man in the Sand (1999)
Wonder Wheel (2006)
The Works (2008)
Woody Guthrie's Happy Joyous Hanukkah (2006)
New Multitudes (2012)
Mermaid Avenue: The Complete Sessions (2012)

References

External links
Nora Guthrie interview
 

Mermaid Avenue Vol. II
Mermaid Avenue Vol. II
Mermaid Avenue Vol. II
Mermaid Avenue Vol. II
Elektra Records albums
Collaborative albums
Woody Guthrie tribute albums
Albums produced by Jeff Tweedy
Albums produced by Grant Showbiz
Sequel albums